The Power Building is a historic commercial building in the downtown of Cincinnati, Ohio, United States.

History 
Built in 1903, it was designed by Harry Hake.  It was listed on the National Register of Historic Places on March 5, 1999.  One week later, a group of buildings in the northeastern section of downtown was named a historic district, the Cincinnati East Manufacturing and Warehouse District; the Power Building is one of the district's contributing properties.  In 2002 the building was renovated and made into high-rise luxury apartments now known as "The Renaissance".

In 2016, the building was sold by Capital Investment Group for $25.4 million cash to a "group of local buyers".

Description 
The building has 117 apartments and 100 parking spaces in the basement floors.

Notes

External links 
 Renaissancecinci.com

1903 establishments in Ohio
National Register of Historic Places in Cincinnati
Skyscrapers in Cincinnati
Historic district contributing properties in Ohio
Commercial buildings on the National Register of Historic Places in Ohio
Residential skyscrapers in Ohio

Buildings and structures completed in 1903